Wesly Allen Mallard (born November 21, 1978) is a former American football linebacker.  He played college football at Oregon and was drafted by the New York Giants in the sixth round of the 2002 NFL Draft.

Mallard has  been a member of the New England Patriots, Tampa Bay Buccaneers, Denver Broncos and Seattle Seahawks, in addition to the Giants.

Early years
He attended Seoul American High School in Seoul, Korea and later went on to attend Hardaway High School in Columbus, Georgia in the United States.

College career
He walked on to the University of Oregon and eventually led the defense in personal tackles in his senior year. He made a name for himself early in his college career on a controversial block he made on Michael Jolivette from Arizona during a punt return in 2000.

Professional career

New York Giants
He was drafted by the New York Giants in the sixth round of the 2002 NFL Draft.

External links
New England Patriots bio

References

1978 births
Living people
American football linebackers
Denver Broncos players
New England Patriots players
New York Giants players
Oregon Ducks football players
Players of American football from Columbus, Georgia
Seattle Seahawks players
Seoul American High School alumni
Tampa Bay Buccaneers players